Gary J. Schmidt (born January 26, 1947) is a former member of the Wisconsin State Assembly for the 5th District.

Schmidt was born in Kaukauna, Wisconsin. He graduated from a high school in Oneida, Wisconsin before attending the Saint Paul Seminary School of Divinity, the William Mitchell College of Law and Minnesota State University, Mankato. During the Vietnam War era, Schmidt served in the United States Marine Corps. He is married and has three children.

Political career
Schmidt was first elected to the Assembly in 1984. Additionally, he was a member of the Kaukauna Area School Board from 1984 to 1987. He is a Republican.

References

1947 births
Living people
People from Kaukauna, Wisconsin
Republican Party members of the Wisconsin State Assembly
School board members in Wisconsin
Military personnel from Wisconsin
United States Marines
Saint Paul Seminary School of Divinity alumni
William Mitchell College of Law alumni
Minnesota State University, Mankato alumni